The Forbidden Garden is a science fiction novel by author John Taine (pseudonym of Eric Temple Bell). It was first published in 1947 by Fantasy Press in an edition of 3,029 copies.

Plot introduction
The novel concerns the search for soil from a remote part of Asia for the cultivation of weird flowers that can destroy humanity.

Reception
P. Schuyler Miller reviewed the novel favorably, writing "[Taine] is standing at your elbow, nudging you with evident relish when you come to passages that were fun to write." Thrilling Wonder Stories also received the novel favorably, declaring that the author "proves his right to the semi-legendary eminence he holds for followers of the fantastic presented via plausible pseudo-science", but faulted Taine for weak characterization, saying "His cast of players comprise a collection of stock dramatic types and no more".

References

1947 American novels
1947 science fiction novels
American science fiction novels
Works by Eric Temple Bell
Works published under a pseudonym
Novels set in Asia
Fantasy Press books